Jean-François-Maurice-Arnauld Dudevant, known as Baron Dudevant but better known by the pseudonym Maurice Sand (June 30, 1823 in Paris – September 4, 1889 in Nohant-Vic), was a French writer, artist and entomologist. He studied art under Eugène Delacroix and also experimented in various other subjects, including geology and biology.

He was the elder child and only son of George Sand, a French novelist and feminist, and her husband, Baron François Casimir Dudevant. In addition to his numerous novels, he is best remembered for his monumental study of commedia dell'arte – Masques et bouffons (comédie italienne), 1860.

Works
 Callirhoé, Paris, M. Lévy frères, 1864
 Catalogue raisonné des lépidoptères du Berry & de l'Auvergne, Paris, E. Deyrolle, 1879
 George Sand et le Théâtre de Nohant, Paris, les Cent une, 1930
 La Fille du singe, Paris, P. Ollendorff, 1886
 Le Coq aux cheveux d'or, Paris, Librairie Internationale, 1867
 Le Québec : lettres de voyage, 1862 ; réimp. Paris, Magellan & Cie, 2006 
 Le Théâtre des marionnettes, Paris, Calmann Lévy, 1890
 L'Atelier d'Eugène Delacroix de 1839 à 1848, Paris, Fondation George et Maurice Sand, 1963
 L'Augusta, Paris, Michel Lévy frères, 1872
 Mademoiselle Azote. André Beauvray, Paris, Lévy, 1870
 Mademoiselle de Cérignan, Paris, Michel-Lévy frères, 1874
 Masques et bouffons (comédie italienne), texte et dessins, préf. George Sand, 1860
 Miss Mary, Paris, Michel Lévy frères, 1868
 Raoul de la Chastre : aventures de guerre et d'amour, Paris, M. Lévy frères, 1865
 Recueil des principaux types créés avec leurs costumes sur le théâtre de Nohant, [S.l. s.n.], 1846–1886
 Six mille lieues à toute vapeur, Paris, M. Lévy frères, 1873 ; réimp. Paris, Guénégaud, 2000 
 Le Monde des Papillons, préface de George Sand, suivi de l'Histoire naturelle des Lépidoptères d'Europe par A. Depuiset, Paris, Rothschild, 1867

References

External links

 
 
 Maurice Sand Papers. General Collection, Beinecke Rare Book and Manuscript Library, Yale University.

1823 births
1889 deaths
Writers from Paris
Commedia dell'arte
Barons of France
French illustrators
19th-century French novelists
French male novelists
19th-century French male writers